The Atlas XH-1 Alpha is a prototype attack helicopter built by Atlas Aviation (now Denel) of South Africa, which used it as a concept demonstrator for the then-planned Rooivalk project.

Development
It was developed from an Aérospatiale Alouette III airframe, retaining that helicopter's engine and dynamic components, but replacing the original cockpit with a stepped tandem one, adding a 20 mm cannon under the chin and converting the undercarriage to tail-dragger configuration.

The XH-1 first flew on 3 February 1985, and soon embarked on a rigorous flight test program to examine the feasibility of a dedicated attack helicopter in southern African conditions. The results were ultimately good enough to convince Atlas and the South African Air Force to go ahead with the development of a dedicated attack helicopter, the Denel Rooivalk.

The XH-1 and Rooivalk are completely different aircraft and share no components. The Rooivalk was developed from the later XH-2 prototype.

The sole XH-1 was retired sometime in the late 1980s and was handed over to the South African Air Force Museum, where it remains to this day.

Specifications (XH-1)

See also

References

Military helicopters
1980s South African attack aircraft
1980s South African helicopters
XH-1
1980s South African experimental aircraft
Cold War military equipment of South Africa
Single-turbine helicopters
Aircraft first flown in 1985